Elisabeth of Brunswick-Wolfenbüttel (23 June 1593 – 25 March 1650) was a princess of Brunswick-Wolfenbüttel and by marriage Duchess of Saxe-Altenburg.

Life 
Elisabeth was born in Wolfenbüttel, the daughter of Duke Henry Julius of Brunswick-Wolfenbüttel (1564–1613) from his second marriage with Elizabeth (1573–1625), eldest daughter of King Frederick II of Denmark.

Elisabeth married first on 1 January 1612 in Dresden, to Duke August of Saxony (1589–1615), the administrator of the diocese of Naumburg. August suddenly died at the age of 26, after only three years of marriage.

Elisabeth's second husband was John Philip of Saxe-Altenburg (1597–1639).  They married on 25 October 1618 in Altenburg.

Elisabeth died on 25 March 1650 in Altenburg and was buried in the Brethren Church in Altenburg, to which she had donated a beaker. The motto of the Duchess, who was with both an Albertine and an Ernestine, was: All my delight is in God. An oval gold ducats exists, depicting Elisabeth exists, showing her effigy on the obverse and a crowned "E" on the reverse.  Elisabeth was a member of the virtuous society under the name the Pious.

Offspring 
From her second marriage, Elisabeth had one daughter:
 Elisabeth Sophie (1619–1680)
married in 1636 Duke Ernst I of Saxe-Gotha (1601–1675)

References 
 New Journal for the History of the Germanic peoples, Volume 1, Issue 1–4, Anton, 1832, p. 88 digitized
 Ute like to eat:princesses at the Saxon court, Leipzig University Press, 2007, p. 128
 Moritz Theodor Frommelt: Sachsen-Altenburg geography or history, Klinkhardt, 1838, p. 129

Footnotes

External links 
 http://www.portrait-hille.de/kap07/bild.asp?catnr1=83302&seqnr=3715
 http://thepeerage.com/p662.htm#i6611

1593 births
1650 deaths
German princesses
Elisabeth
Elisabeth
Elisabeth
Daughters of monarchs